Didonia is a genus of fungi within the Hyaloscyphaceae family. The genus contains 5 species.

References

External links
Didonia at Index Fungorum

Hyaloscyphaceae